The Menagerie is a dark fantasy novel series written by Christopher Golden and Thomas E. Sniegoski. The Menagerie is made up of legendary characters, each with his or her own powers and mystical, mythical origins. Golden and Sniegoski have taken various characters well known from literature and mythology and made them their own.

Ace Books describes them as "beings of myth and legend. They possess powers beyond imagining. They are our only hope. Meet the Menagerie - as hodge-podge a mix of other-worldly beings as anyone can imagine. But a sorcerer, a scientist, a sixteen-year-old demon, and the others all have one thing in common: a hunger for justice - no matter what the cost."

Titles
 The Nimble Man - published October 2004 Ace Books 

 Tears of the Furies - published May 2005 Ace Books 

 Stones Unturned - published September 2006 Ace Books 
 Crashing Paradise - published August 2007 Ace Books  or

Character guide
The Menagerie
 Mr. Doyle -
 Eve - Eve is the first woman.
 Clay - 
 Danny Ferrick -
 Dr. Leonard Graves -
 Squire -
 Lady Ceridwen -

Others
 Nigel Gull
 Tassarian
 Lorenzo Sanguedolce (a.k.a. Sweetblood the Mage)
 The Demogorgon

Worlds
 The Blight
 Faerie
 Hades
 Hell
 River of Souls
 Shadowpaths

Events
Three Ages of Man have been mentioned so far.
 First Age of Man  - Creation to Civilization.
 Second Age of Man  - The Mythological Age
 Third Age of Man  - The Modern Age.
 Golden Age of Heroes - The early days of Pulp heroes, which included Dr. Graves, Joe Falcon, The Siren and, for a while, The Whisper.
 The Twilight Wars - A series of wars that involved the Fey, Hobgoblins, and the Corca-Duibhne, amongst many others. Ceriweden's mother was killed during one. Conan Doyle fought for the fae. The most recent wars took place around the same time as World War I and II.

Literary significance and criticism
"Move over, X-Men and the League of Extraordinary Gentlemen, here comes the Menagerie!" - The Barnes & Noble review

The fourth Book Crashing Paradise, is to be the last book in the series. In an email response given by Golden regarding when the fifth book would be printed, he replied, "I'm sorry to say that sales on the series weren't very good, and the fourth book, CRASHING PARADISE, is likely the last one, at least for now."

External links
 The official Christopher Golden website
 The official Thomas E. Sniegoski website
 The Christopher Golden Message Forblog and MySpace page.
 

Novel series
Ace Books books